Monastery of Saint John may refer to:

, Azerbaijan
Patriarchal Stavropegic Monastery of St. John the Baptist, Essex, England
Monastery of St John, Pontefract, Yorkshire, England
Saint John monastery or Natlismtsemeli monastery, Georgia
Monastery of Saint John the Theologian, Patmos, Greece
Monastery of St. John Theristis, Italy
Monastery of St. John in the Wilderness, Jerusalem
Saint John the Baptist Orthodox Monastery, at Al-Maghtas, Jordan
Saint John Bigorski Monastery, North Macedonia
Monastery of St John the Studite, Constantinople, Turkey
Monastery of St. John the Baptist, at Qasr al-Yahud, West Bank